Gardiehbey Zeo (born February 3, 1986 in Monrovia) is a Liberian footballer (striker) playing formerly for Heart of Lions.  He is also a member of the Liberia national football team.

References

http://www.thenewdawnliberia.com/index.php?option=com_content&view=article&id=2021:bob-zeo-gears-up&catid=27:football&Itemid=73

1986 births
Living people
Liberian footballers
Association football forwards
Sekondi Wise Fighters players
Expatriate footballers in Ghana
Heart of Lions F.C. players
Sportspeople from Monrovia
Liberia international footballers